The 2013 season was Eamon O'Shea's first year as manager of the Tipperary senior hurling team.
On 25 September 2012, he succeeded Declan Ryan as manager.
A panel of 26 players was announced in December 2012 to prepare for the Allianz Hurling League.
In February Shane McGrath was appointed as captain for the 2013 season.

Tipperary's first Championship game came against Limerick on 9 June, where they were defeated 1-18 to 1-15 at the Gaelic Grounds.

In phase 2 of the All-Ireland qualifiers on 6 July 2013, Tipperary were eliminated from championship after a 1-14 to 0-20 defeat to Kilkenny at Nowlan Park.

On 17 October, goalkeeper Brendan Cummins announced his retirement from the Tipperary hurling team after 20 years and 73 championship appearances.

2013 senior hurling management team

2013 Squad

The following players made their senior debut in 2013.
Kieran Bergin
John O'Dwyer
Thomas Hamill
Jason Forde

2013 Waterford Crystal Cup
Defending champions Tipperary faced Clare in the final under lights in Thurles on 9 February, with Clare winning by 1-21 to 1-13.

2013 National Hurling League
Tipperary reached the semi final stage of the hurling league and defeated Dublin by 4-20 to 0-17 at Semple Stadium on 21 April.
As a contest the match was effectively over within the first 10 minutes with Tipperary leading by eight points, 2-3 to 0-1 with an early goal from Shane Bourke and a further goal from Patrick Maher. Séamus Callanan scored a third goal from a penalty to leave the half time score at 3-11 to 0-8. A fourth goal came in the last minute of the game from substitute Michael Heffernan after a mistake from the Dublin goalkeeper.

Tipperary were defeated by Kilkenny in the final by 2-17 to 0-20 on 5 May in Nowlan Park.

Michael Fennelly scored two goals and three points in the first half as Kilkenny led by 2-07 to 0-11. In the second half Lar Corbett and JJ Delaney were sent off in the 46th minute after they wrestled each other on the ground near the Kilkenny goal.

Results

Division 1A

2013 Munster Senior Hurling Championship

2013 All-Ireland Senior Hurling Championship

Phase 2

The game was shown live on TV3. A crowd of 23,307 attended the game in Nowlan Park in Kilkenny on a sunny Saturday evening.	
The sides were level at half-time on a 1-06 to 0-09 with Lar Corbett getting the goal for Tipperary after 14 minutes when he finished with a shot to corner of the net when the ball broke to him from ten yards out. Corbett was forced off with a hamstring injury after 28 minutes. Henry Shefflin came on as a substitute for Kilkenny with five minutes remaining as they ran out winners by three points. The game was Brendan Cummins's last match for Tipperary.

References

External links
Tipperary GAA Archives 2013
Tipperary GAA at Hogan Stand
Tipperary Player Profiles for 2013
Match Highlights Munster Semi-Final v Limerick
Full game v Kilkenny

Tipperary
Tipperary county hurling team seasons